The Serbian Radical Party "9th January", formerly Serbian Radical Party "Dr. Vojislav Šešelj", was a minor Serbian nationalist party in Bosnia and Herzegovina, active in Republika Srpska. The party consisted of the Bosnian faction that remained under the wings of the Serbian Radical Party (SRS) and its leader Vojislav Šešelj after his departure to the Hague; the branch that split off was the Serbian Radical Party of Republika Srpska under the leadership of Milanko Mihajlica. The party's chairman is undetermined, it was Mirko Blagojević until 2013, and the party has since chosen Dragan Đurđević, though the former still claims leadership. Their slogan is Radikalno naprijed ("Radically forwards").

The headquarters of the party are located in Bijeljina.

Parliamentary elections

References

External links

Serbian Radical Party
Conservative parties in Bosnia and Herzegovina
Political parties in Republika Srpska
Serb political parties in Bosnia and Herzegovina
Serb nationalist parties